(November 1, 1935) is a retired Japanese professional wrestler. She is a former holder of the now-defunct AJWP title and the NWA World Women's Championship. She has competed in both Japan and the United States.

Yukiko Tomoe defeated The Fabulous Moolah for the NWA Women's title in Japan on March 10, 1968. She lost the title to Moolah less than a month later, on April 2, 1968.

Championships and accomplishments
 All Japan Women's Pro-Wrestling
 AGWA International Girls' Championship (1 time)
 JWPA Japanese Heavyweight Championship (1 time)
 AJW Hall of Fame
 National Wrestling Alliance
 NWA World Women's Championship (1 time)

References

External links 
 

1935 births
20th-century professional wrestlers
Japanese female professional wrestlers
Living people
People from Utsunomiya, Tochigi
NWA World Women's Champions